Santa Isabel is one of the 67 municipalities of Chihuahua, in northern Mexico. The municipal seat lies at Santa Isabel. The municipality covers an area of 1,040.8 km².

As of 2010, the municipality had a total population of 3,937, up from 3,820 as of 2005. 

As of 2010, the town of Santa Isabel had a population of 1,378. Other than the town of Santa Isabel, the municipality had 52 localities, none of which had a population over 1,000.

Geography

Towns and villages
The municipality has 27 localities. The largest are:

References

Municipalities of Chihuahua (state)